Club Polideportivo Granada 74 was a Spanish football club based in Granada, in the autonomous community of Andalusia. Founded in 1974, it last played in Tercera División in 2009, holding home games at Ciudad Deportiva Granada 92, with a capacity of 16,200 spectators.

History
Granada 74 was founded in 1974 in the neighborhood of La Chana. After 21 years, it first competed in the fourth division, in a spell that would last one full decade.

At the end of the 2006–07 season, CP Granada returned from the regional leagues in Andalusia. However, after the relocation of second level club Ciudad de Murcia to Granada, with that team being renamed Granada 74 CF, it was announced that CP Granada 74 would become the new club's reserve team. The relocated Granada team ceased to operate in 2009, leaving the original team to become the senior side once again, however this team also ceased operations soon after.

Season to season

12 seasons in Tercera División

References

External links
Official website  

Football clubs in Andalusia
Sport in Granada
Association football clubs established in 1974
Granada 74 CF
1974 establishments in Spain
Association football clubs disestablished in 2009
2009 disestablishments in Spain